The Presidency of the International Criminal Court is the organ responsible for the proper administration of the Court (apart from the Office of the Prosecutor).

The Presidency oversees the activities of the Registry and organises the work of the judicial divisions.  It also has some responsibilities in the area of external relations, such as negotiating agreements on behalf of the court and promoting public awareness and understanding of the institution.

The Presidency comprises the President and the First and Second Vice-Presidents — three judges of the court who are elected to the Presidency by their fellow judges for a maximum of two three-year terms.

As of March 2021, the President is Piotr Hofmański from Poland, who took office on 11 March 2021. His first term will expire in 2024.

References